Actenoptila is a genus of moths in the Carposinidae family.

Species
Actenoptila eucosma Diakonoff, 1954
Actenoptila eustales Diakonoff, 1954
Actenoptila heliotropia Diakonoff, 1954

References

Natural History Museum Lepidoptera generic names catalog

Carposinidae
Moth genera